Chawla is a surname among Hindus and Sikhs of India. It originates from the name of a clan of the Arora caste, likely stemming from the crop word chawal, which means rice.

Notable people
Notable people with the surname, who may or may not be affiliated with the clan/religions, include:
 Kalpana Chawla (1962–2003), Indian-American astronaut killed in the Space Shuttle Columbia disaster
 Bhumika Chawla (born 1978), Indian actress
 Bobby Chawla (born 1982), Danish cricketer
 Devika Chawla, Indian pop singer
 Harcharan Chawla (1926–2001), Indian Urdu writer
 Harpinder Singh Chawla (born 1950), Indian dental surgeon and medical researcher
 Himani Chawla, Indian television actress
 Himanshu Chawla (born 1991), Indian cricketer
 Isha Chawla (born 1988), Indian film actress
 Juhi Chawla (born 1967), Indian actress
 Kailash Chawla (born 1948), Indian politician 
 Keerthi Chawla (born 1981), Indian actress
 Laxmi Kanta Chawla, Indian politician
 Louise Chawla, American professor
 Piyush Chawla (born 1988), Indian cricketer
 Prabhu Chawla (born 1946), Indian journalist and editor of India Today
 Preetika Chawla, Indian film actress
 Shuchi Chawla, US-based Indian computer scientist
 Surveen Chawla, Indian actress
 Tarang Chawla (born 1987), Indian-born Australian activist and writer
 Yogesh Kumar Chawla, Indian medical doctor

Other uses
 Chawla (crater), a lunar crater named after Kalpana Chawla.

References

Arora clans
Hindu surnames